Spiranthes aestivalis, commonly called the summer lady's-tresses, is a species of orchid found in western Europe, Turkey, Russia, and North Africa. The specific epithet, aestivalis, is derived from Latin and means "pertaining to the summer".

See also
List of extinct plants of the British Isles

References 

Aestivalis
Orchids of Europe
Orchids of Russia
Flora of Turkey
Plants described in 1817